Banton may refer to:

Places
 Banton, Romblon, island municipality in the Philippines
 Banton, North Lanarkshire, a village near the town of Kilsyth, Scotland

People
Bernie Banton, Australian asbestosis victims campaigner
Buju Banton, Jamaican dancehall deejay and singer
Burro Banton, Jamaican dancehall deejay
Dalano Banton (born 1999), Canadian basketball player
Hugh Banton (born 1949), British organist and organ builder
Michael Banton (born 1926), British social scientist
Pato Banton (born 1961), British reggae singer and deejay
Starkey Banton (born 1962), British reggae deejay
Tom Banton (born 1998), English Cricketer